Gammalipothrixvirus is a genus of viruses in the family Lipothrixviridae. Archaea acidianus serve as natural hosts. There is only one species in this genus: Acidianus filamentous virus 1.

Structure

Viruses in Gammalipothrixvirus are enveloped, with rod-shaped geometries. The diameter is around 24 nm, with a length of 900 nm. Genomes are linear, around 20kb in length. The genome codes for 40 proteins.

Life cycle
Viral replication is cytoplasmic. Entry into the host cell is achieved by adsorption into the host cell. DNA-templated transcription is the method of transcription. Archaea acidianus serve as the natural host. Transmission routes are passive diffusion.

References

External links
 Viralzone: Gammalipothrixvirus
 ICTV

Lipothrixviridae
Virus genera